Zippel may refer to:

Surname
Anna Zippel (died 1676), alleged Swedish witch, tried in Stockholm during the Swedish witch mania of 1668–1676
Brita Zippel (died 1676), alleged Swedish witch, known as "Näslösan", one of the most famous figures of the Swedish witch mania
David Zippel (born 1954), American musical theatre lyricist

Places
Zippel Bay State Park, state park in Lake of the Woods County, Minnesota in the United States
Zippel Township, Lake of the Woods County, Minnesota, township in Lake of the Woods County, Minnesota, United States

See also
Schwartz–Zippel lemma